Joe Dial (born October 26, 1962, in Marlow, Oklahoma) is a retired American pole vaulter, best known for winning the bronze medal at the 1989 World Indoor Championships in Budapest. His personal best was 5.96 metres, achieved in June 1987 in Norman, Oklahoma.

While competing for Marlow High School, he was Track and Field News "High School Athlete of the Year" in 1981.

Since retiring from the sport, Dial has turned to coaching. He was the head coach of the men's and women's track and cross country programs at Oral Roberts University in Tulsa, Oklahoma from 1993-2022. During his tenure at ORU, he coached 50 All-Americans and turned ORU into a powerhouse in the Mid-Continent Conference.

In spite of his coaching a rival school, Dial is still a popular alum of Oklahoma State University, and was named to the OSU Hall of Fame in 2002. He and his wife Shawna, an assistant coach at ORU, have three sons.

In July of 2022, Dial was hired as head coach of Jenks High School's boys' cross country, and boys' track and field.

References

External links

ORU bio

1962 births
Living people
People from Marlow, Oklahoma
Sportspeople from Tulsa, Oklahoma
Track and field athletes from Oklahoma
Oklahoma State Cowboys track and field athletes
American male pole vaulters
Oral Roberts Golden Eagles track and field coaches
American track and field coaches
Oral Roberts Golden Eagles cross country coaches
World Athletics Indoor Championships medalists